Dolno Tserovene is a village in Northwestern Bulgaria.
It is located in Yakimovo Municipality, Montana Province.

See also
List of villages in Montana Province

Villages in Montana Province